Oak Hill is an unincorporated community in northwest Crawford County, in the U.S. state of Missouri. The community is located on the east bank of Brush Creek, one-quarter mile south of the Crawford-Gasconade county line and is on Missouri Route CC, one mile east of Missouri Route 19.

History
The community of Oak Hill had its start circa 1860, and was likely named for the character of the local terrain. A post office called Oak Hill was established in 1870, and remained in operation until 1944.

References

Unincorporated communities in Crawford County, Missouri
Unincorporated communities in Missouri